Shahrak-e Ayatollah  Madani (also Romanized as Shahrak-e Āyatollah Madanī) is a village in Jarahi Rural District, in the Central District of Mahshahr County, Khuzestan Province, Iran. At the 2006 census, its population was 4,295, in 901 families.

References 

Populated places in Mahshahr County